Wankdorf Stadium was a football stadium in Bern, Switzerland, and the home of Swiss club BSC Young Boys. Built in 1925, it hosted the finals of the 1954 FIFA World Cup, the 1960–61 European Cup, and the 1988–89 European Cup Winners' Cup.

The stadium was demolished in 2001, and replaced in 2005 by the Stadion Wankdorf on the same site.

History 
The original Wankdorf stadium was opened in 1925 after a construction period of seven months. It had a capacity of 22,000, of which 1,200 covered seats and covered standing room for another 5,000 people. The first international match took place on 8 November 1925; 18,000 spectators witnessed the 2–0 victory of the Swiss national team against Austria.

From 1933 to 1939, the stadium was gradually enlarged with an additional training field and finally the construction of bleachers across from the grandstand, increasing the capacity to 42,000. For the Football World Cup of 1954, the stadium was demolished and a new one with a capacity of 64,000 spectators (on 8,000 seats and standing room for 56,000) was inaugurated shortly before the tournament began. On 4 July 1954, the legendary "Miracle of Bern", the unexpected 3–2 victory of the German team over the Hungarians in the final, made the stadium an icon of football history.

The stadium saw two more major finals: in 1961, the final of the European Cup was played in the Wankdorf stadium. S.L. Benfica won 3–2 against FC Barcelona on 31 May. In 1989, the stadium was the venue of the final of the Cup Winners' Cup: on 10 May, FC Barcelona won 2–0 against U.C. Sampdoria.

The stadium was demolished in 2001, and a new stadium was constructed in its place. The last match in the stadium was played on 7 July 2001; Young Boys played 1–1 against the team of Lugano in a match in the Swiss Super League. The final blasting of the derelict edifice occurred on 3 August 2001.

The new Stade de Suisse, Wankdorf, opened in summer 2005 and was one of the venues for Euro 2008.

The band Muse credits Wankdorf stadium as inspiring the aptly named 'Wankdorf Jam'.

1954 FIFA World Cup
Wankdorf Stadium hosted five games of the 1954 FIFA World Cup, including the final matches.

See also 
List of football stadiums in Switzerland

References 
History of the Wankdorf/Stade de Suisse

External links 
Image gallery with many historical images from 1898 to 2002
Image gallery of the old Wankdorf Stadium and building of the new Stade de Suisse

1954 FIFA World Cup stadiums
Defunct football venues in Switzerland
Buildings and structures in Bern
Sports venues in the Canton of Bern
Defunct sports venues in Switzerland
Sports venues completed in 1925
1925 establishments in Switzerland
Sports venues demolished in 2001
Demolished buildings and structures in Switzerland
20th-century architecture in Switzerland